Twelfth Night is a play by William Shakespeare.

Twelfth Night may also refer to:

Film and television
 Twelfth Night (1910 film), a short silent film
 Twelfth Night (1933 film), a short Technicolor film
 Twelfth Night (1955 film) or Dvenadtsataya noch, a Russian language film
 Twelfth Night (1966 film), an Australian television film
 Twelfth Night (1970 film), a British television film
 Twelfth Night (1980 film), a film by John Gorrie for BBC Television Shakespeare
 Twelfth Night (1986 film), an Australian film
 Twelfth Night (1988 film), a television adaptation of Kenneth Branagh's 1987 stage production
 Twelfth Night (1996 film), a film by Trevor Nunn
 Twelfth Night, or What You Will, a 1998 TV film by Nicholas Hytner

Other uses
 Twelfth Night (holiday) or Epiphany Eve or the Twelfth Day of Christmas, January 5
 Twelfth Night (band), an English neo-progressive rock band
 Twelfth Night Theatre, a theatre in Brisbane, Queensland, Australian 
 Twelfth Night, an album by Mark Knopfler and Eric Clapton